What Happens Next may refer to:

 What Happens Next? (film), 2012 documentary film about Dan Mangan
What Happens Next? (band), American thrashcore band
 What Happens Next (Gang of Four album), 2015
What Happens Next (Joe Satriani album) and its title track, 2018
What Happens Next (What Happened Then?), a 1984 album by American hardcore punk band Ill Repute

Other uses
 What Happens Next?: A History of Hollywood Screenwriting, a book  by Marc Norman

See also
 What Comes Next (disambiguation)